Santa Fe de Antioquia is a municipality in the Antioquia Department, Colombia. It has a population of approximately 23,000 inhabitants.

History
Founded in 1541 by Jorge Robledo as Villa de Santafé on the western bank of the Cauca River, in 1545 it received the coat of arms and the title of City of Antioquia from King Philip II of Spain. It was elevated to the status of parish in 1547 by the bishop of Popayán. It changed its name in 1584 when it became the capital of Antioquia. It was a mining town from its beginnings and the gold mining operation has been the base of its economy.

Its cathedral was constructed in 1799 and elevated to the Diocese of Antioquia in 1804 by Pope Pius VII. In 1813 Antioquia was declared a sovereign and independent state with Santa Fe as its capital, a status it maintained until 1826, when Medellín was chosen as the new departmental seat. Due to the state of conservation of its colonial architecture, it was declared a national monument in 1960.

Geography

Climate 
The climate of Santa Fe de Antioquia is tropical and humid, typical of Colombia's Cauca River valley, due to its low altitude and its geographical location near the equator. The average temperature is  throughout the year. This pleasant weather has allowed tourism to develop in the city, which has been filled with hostels, hotels and water parks frequented by people from Medellín and the near metropolitan area.

Economy
The economy of Santa Fe de Antioquia is based on agriculture: the main products are coffee, maize and beans.

Tourism
Tourism has been, and continues to be one of the more important economic enterprises for the municipality. The opening of the Tunnel of the West (which reduces the time and the distance between the locality and Medellín) in 2006 has allowed hundreds of tourists to arrive each weekend, stimulating the vocation of the vicinity as a summer vacation site. In 2017 a modernization project began on its main Plaza which was completed in 2018. The project closed traffic to cars and added gardens with the help of Botanical Garden of Medellín.

Santa Fe was named a Pueblo Patrimonio (heritage town) of Colombia in 2010. It was the only municipality in Antioquia selected to be part of the Red Turística de Pueblos Patrimonio original cohort.

Sites of Interest

All of the town is a historical site; the architecture that has survived through the years gives Santa Fe de Antioquia the aspect of a city "suspended" in the colonial era, which is the reason the city was declared National monument.

Puente de Occidente (Bridge of the West, a National Monument); suspension bridge built in 1887, same year as the Eiffel Tower, over the Cauca River.
Metropolitan Cathedral
Archiepiscopal Palace
Plaza Mayor Juan de Corral
Museum of Religious Art
The House of the Two Palms
La Playita (Famous Ranch To The South of the Plaza)
Tonusco Campestre

See also
Antioquian languages

References

External links
City of Santa Fe de Antioquia official government website

 
Municipalities of Antioquia Department
Populated places established in 1541
1541 establishments in the Spanish Empire